2'-5'-oligoadenylate synthetase 3 is an enzyme that in humans is encoded by the OAS3 gene.

This gene encodes an enzyme included in the 2', 5' oligoadenylate synthase family.  This enzyme is induced by interferons and catalyzes the 2', 5' oligomers of ATP. These oligomers activate latent RNase L, leading to degradation of both viral and endogenous RNA.  This enzyme family plays a significant role in the inhibition of cellular protein synthesis in response to viral infection.

References

Further reading

External links